Tihomir Dragoslavić (born 20 November 1967) is a former Austrian/Croatian footballer who played as a midfielder.

External links
 

1967 births
Living people
Austrian footballers
DSV Leoben players
FC Waidhofen/Ybbs players
SV Spittal players
Eerste Divisie players
Association football midfielders